The Basilica of Our Lady of Walsingham, informally known as the Slipper Chapel or the Chapel of Saint Catherine of Alexandria, is a Catholic basilica in Houghton Saint Giles, Norfolk, England. Built in 1340, it was the last chapel on the pilgrim route to Walsingham.

Pope Pius XII granted a canonical coronation to the venerated statue of the Blessed Virgin Mary under the title of Our Lady of Walsingham presently enshrined within the chapel on 15 August 1954. 
 
Pope Francis raised the sanctuary to the status of a minor basilica via an apostolic decree on 27 December 2015.

Early history
When the Slipper Chapel was built, Walsingham was second only to Canterbury in the ranks of importance in English pilgrimage.

In 1538, after King Henry VIII's English Reformation, the chapel fell into disuse and was variously used as a poor house, a forge, a cowshed and a barn. In 1863, the chapel was identified by a wealthy local woman, Miss Charlotte Pearson Boyd (1837–1906), a convert to Catholicism from Anglicanism. She bought the building from the farm owner in 1896, restored it and then donated the chapel to  Downside Abbey for Catholic use. On 6 February 1897, the chapel was re-established as a shrine authorising the image for public veneration by papal rescript from Pope Leo XIII. It was restored in 1904 by Thomas Garner.

On the Feast of the Assumption, 15 August 1934, the Bishop of Northampton, Laurence Youens celebrated the first public Mass in the Slipper Chapel for four hundred years, and two days later Cardinal Francis Bourne led a national pilgrimage of the Catholic bishops of England and Wales and more than 10,000 people to the shrine. From this date it became the Catholic National Shrine of Our Lady.

Canonical coronation of the image

Twenty years later on 15 August 1954, Pope Pius XII delegated his Papal nuncio, Monsignor Gerald O'Hara to crown the venerated image of the Virgin Mary under the same title in his apostolic name, funded by gold donated by female devotees and accompanied by his papal bull from the Sacred Congregation of Rites.

Moments after the coronation ceremony, two white doves descended on the lap of the image, which was considered miraculous by devotees. The ceremony was accompanied by both British and American pilots who sponsored the security for the event, and devotees who processed barefoot in the "Holy Mile" leading into the shrine.

Holy Mile
Many modern pilgrims remove their shoes at the Slipper Chapel and walk the last mile, called the "Holy Mile",  into Walsingham barefoot. The Slipper Chapel contains a stone statue of the Virgin Mary carved by Marcel Barbeau. The statue was taken to Wembley to be blessed by Pope John Paul II when he visited England on 29 May 1982.

Each year on 8 September, on the Feast of the Birth of Our Lady, the statue of Our Lady of Walsingham is carried for several miles in a procession which begins at the Slipper Chapel.

The Grade II listed presbytery was built in 1904, probably by Garner. Today, the complex surrounding the Slipper Chapel includes a Chapel of Reconciliation, built in 1982, which can seat up to 350 people for services and can be opened towards the pilgrimage area in occasion of bigger ceremonies; a bookshop; and a tearoom.

In 2007 the Slipper Chapel featured in the BBC documentary series How We Built Britain, presented by David Dimbleby.

Status as a minor basilica
Pope Francis raised the sanctuary to the status of a minor basilica on 27 December 2015, along with the Catholic shrine of Our Lady of Walsingham via a pontifical decree from the Congregation for Divine Worship and the Discipline of the Sacraments.

Rector 
1964–1968: Peter Harris (Westminster)
1968–1978: Roland Connelly
1979–1984: Clive Birch
1984–1992: Peter Allen
1992–2000: Alan Williams
2000–2008: Noel Wynn
2008–2015: Alan Williams
2015–2020: John Armitage (Brentwood)
2020–present: Philip Moger.

Interior

References

External links
Catholic National Shrine and Basilica of Our Lady
The Slipper Chapel on the Walsingham website
The Slipper Chapel on the Norfolk Churches website

Religious buildings and structures completed in 1340
14th-century Roman Catholic church buildings in the United Kingdom
Christian pilgrimages
Chapels in England
Shrines to the Virgin Mary
Roman Catholic churches in Norfolk
Religion in Norfolk
Minor basilicas in the United Kingdom
Roman Catholic chapels in England
Grade I listed churches in Norfolk
Walsingham
14th-century church buildings in England
Conventual Franciscan churches in the United Kingdom
Roman Catholic shrines in the United Kingdom